Nick Sullivan (born June 21, 1979) is an American luger. He competed in the men's singles event at the 2002 Winter Olympics.

References

External links
 

1979 births
Living people
American male lugers
Olympic lugers of the United States
Lugers at the 2002 Winter Olympics
Sportspeople from Saint Paul, Minnesota